is a Chinese-Japanese (中国系日本人) actor based in Japan. Of mixed Chinese and Japanese descent (his grandmother was Japanese), he is able to speak both Mandarin and Japanese fluently.

Early life
Abe's original name was Li Zhendong (李振冬); after he moved to Japan at age 9, he changed to using his present name. He spent a year at the Beijing Film Academy at age 18.

Filmography

Television 
 Michael the Archangel's Dance (TTV, 2004)
 The Proof of Memories (记忆的证明) (CCTV, 2004)
 Boys Over Flowers as Mimasaka Akira (TBS, 2005)
 Yakusha Damashii (Fuji TV, 2006)
 Mop Girl (TV Asahi, 2007, ep10)
 Kikujiro to Saki 3 as Kitano Shigekazu (TV Asahi, 2007)
 Shinuka to Omotta (NTV, 2007, ep6)
 Boys Over Flowers: Returns as Mimasaka Akira (TBS, 2007)
 Koizora as Fukuhara Yuu (TBS, 2008, ep.4 & 5)
 Absolute Boyfriend as Nightly Series Type 02 Toshiki (Fuji TV, 2008, ep8)
 Qi Lin Guan Zhi Lian (2008)
 Wish to See You Again (CTS, 2008, ep05)
 Mirai Koshi Meguru as Kaneda Daisaku (TV Asahi, 2008, ep2)
 Alice in Borderland as Keiichi Kuzuryū (Netflix, 2020–22)

Films 
 Public Toilet (2000)
 Initial D (2005)
 Until the Lights Come Back (2005)
 Inugoe (2006)
 Christmas on July 24th Avenue (2006)
 Rough (2006)
 Catch – Guo Shi Wu Shuang (國士無雙) (2006)
 Big Stan (2007)
 Stand In Love (不完全恋人) (2007)
 Boys Over Flowers: Final (2008)
 The Incite Mill (2010)
 Mozu (2015)
 Assassination Classroom: Graduation (2016)
 Sora (2021)

Endorsements
 Toyota (2004)
 Yamaha Vino (2004)
 So Nice Clothing (2002)
 HSBC Bank (2002)

References

1982 births
Chinese emigrants to Japan
Male actors from Heilongjiang
Japanese male film actors
Japanese male television actors
Living people
21st-century Japanese male actors